Phillip Norris "Army" Armstrong (September 15, 1898 – October 11, 1981) was an American football player and coach. He played college football at Centre College in Danville, Kentucky from 1918 to 1919 and professionally for one season, in 1922, with the Milwaukee Badgers of the National Football League (NFL). Armstong served as the head football coach at Carroll College—now known as Carroll University—Waukesha, Wisconsin from 1923 to 1930, compiling a record of 44–11–6.

Playing career

Centre

Norris played tackle and halfback for Centre College in Danville, Kentucky and was a key offensive player  during the 1921 Centre vs. Harvard football game, and was captain of the team that year.  He was also a player on the school's basketball team.  Centre College honored his contribution to the school's athletic program by inducting him into the college's Athletic Hall of Fame. He was a halfback on Centre's all-time football team chosen in 1935.

Milwaukee Badgers
After graduation from Centre, Norris played professionally for the 1922 season as a tackle for the Milwaukee Badgers of the National Football League (NFL) alongside his college teammate Bo McMillin.

Coaching career

Centenary
Armstrong's first coaching position was in 1922 at Centenary College of Louisiana.  Here he was assistant to his college teammate (and future professional teammate) Bo McMillin where they produced an impressive record of eight wins and one loss while outscoring opponents 295 to 41.

Carroll

After completing one year as an assistant coach, Armstrong was named the 15th head football at Carroll College—now known as Carroll University—in Waukesha, Wisconsin and he held that position for eight seasons, from 1923 until 1930. His career coaching record at Carroll College was 44–11–6.

Armstrong oversaw one of the most successful periods of the football team at the college.  The university honored his contributions by inducting him into the school's "Hall of Fame" in 1973.

Key games for Carroll under Armstrong included the 1925 victory over Great Lakes Naval by a score of 73–0, and an undefeated 1925 season. The program never had anything but winning seasons under Armstrong, with the worst record being 4–3 in 1929; the worst loss that year was a 46–0 defeat by the Iowa Hawkeyes.

After retiring from coaching, Armstrong remain with Carroll College to become athletic director and later a trustee of the college.

Head coaching record

References

External links
 
 

1898 births
1981 deaths
American football halfbacks
American football tackles
Basketball coaches from Arkansas
Centenary Gentlemen football coaches
Centre Colonels football players
Carroll Pioneers football coaches
Carroll Pioneers men's basketball coaches
All-Southern college football players
Sportspeople from Fort Smith, Arkansas
Coaches of American football from Arkansas
Players of American football from Arkansas